Tochi Phil Chukwuani (born 24 March 2003) is a Danish professional footballer who plays as a midfielder for Danish Superliga club Lyngby Boldklub.

Club career

Nordsjælland
Born in Herlev to Nigerian parents, Chukwuani started playing football in the youth of B.93 before moving to the youth academy of Superliga club FC Nordsjælland. He practiced with the first team at age 14, and head coach Flemming Pedersen stated that he was "one of the top players of the future". In July 2019, Chukwuani signed a three-year contract, keeping him in Nordsjælland until 2022.

On 22 September 2019, Chukwuani made his professional debut in the Superliga in a 2–1 home win over AaB, thereby becoming the sixth youngest player to appear in a game in the league. He came on as a substitute in the 82nd minute for Magnus Kofod Andersen. On 17 July 2020, Chukwuani scored his first senior goal in a 6–3 away loss to eventual champions Midtjylland. With the goal, he became the club's youngest scorer in league history, a record that was broken the following season by teammate Andreas Schjelderup at 16 years and 284 days. He finished the season with 9 total appearances his which he scored one goal.

On 5 April 2022 it was reported, that Chukwuani had signed with Italian Serie A club Hellas Verona. Among others, the well-known transfer journalist Fabrizio Romano posted a picture of Chukwuani back in April, wearing a Verona jersey. However, according to an Italian newspaper on 14 July 2022, Chukwuani failed the medical check in Verona because the medical staff had found a minor heart defect and as there were strict rules in Italy regarding heart problems, the transfer was no longer possible.

Lyngby
After training with Lyngby Boldklub for several weeks, the club confirmed on 31 August 2022, that Chukwuani had signed a two-year deal with the newly promoted Danish Superliga team.

International career
He is a youth international for Denmark.

Career statistics

Club

References

External links
 
 

2003 births
Living people
Danish men's footballers
People from Herlev Municipality
Sportspeople from the Capital Region of Denmark
Denmark youth international footballers
Danish people of Nigerian descent
Association football midfielders
Danish Superliga players
FC Nordsjælland players
Lyngby Boldklub players